The (Co-)Cathedral of Castelo Branco or Church of Saint Michael (archangel) is a Roman Catholic Latin Co-cathedral and former cathedral in Castelo Branco, Portugal.
 
 
It is the second official seat of the Catholic Diocese of Portalegre-Castelo Branco, as the bishopric's two-part title suggests, ranking after the Cathedral of Portalegre.

History 
Much of the cathedral was built in the style of the Renaissance, in the 17th century. It lost its status as a cathedral in 1881 when the Diocese of Castelo Branco (founded 1771) was absorbed by the then Diocese of Portalegre (which also adopted its title). It was restored as co-cathedral in 1956.

Since 12 September 1978, it is protected as one of the National monuments of Portugal.

References

Sources and external links 
 GCatholic with Google satellite map

Roman Catholic cathedrals in Portugal
National monuments in Castelo Branco District
Cathedral Castelo Branco
Tourist attractions in Castelo Branco District
Buildings and structures in Castelo Branco, Portugal